Theodora (HWV 68) is a dramatic oratorio in three acts by George Frideric Handel, set to an English libretto by Thomas Morell. The oratorio concerns the Christian martyr Theodora and her Christian-converted Roman lover, Didymus. It had its first performance at Covent Garden Theatre on 16 March 1750. Not popular with audiences in Handel's day, Theodora is now recognised as a masterpiece. It is usually given in concert, being an oratorio, but is sometimes staged.

Context, analysis, and performance history

Handel wrote Theodora during his last period of composition. He was sixty-four years old when he began working on it in June 1749. He had written the oratorios Solomon and Susanna the previous year. Theodora would be his penultimate oratorio.

Theodora differs from the former two oratorios because it is a tragedy, ending in the death of the heroine and her converted lover. It is also Handel's only dramatic oratorio in English on a Christian subject.

Thomas Morell (1703–1784) had worked with Handel before on several oratorios. He and Handel were good friends; the composer left the librettist 200 pounds in his will. Morell's source for the libretto was The Martyrdom of Theodora and of Didymus (1687) by Robert Boyle, a prominent scientist and theologian. He also borrowed from Corneille's Théodore, Vierge et Martyre.

Handel finished the oratorio on 31 July 1749, and its premiere was on 16 March 1750. Theodora was a failure with the public and only played three times. There are at least two explanations for this. First, the theme of the persecution and martyrdom of a Christian saint may have been too removed from the Old Testament narratives that Londoners had become accustomed to from Handel's dramatic oratorios. Second, an earthquake that transpired about a week before the premiere had caused some of Handel's usual patrons to flee the city. It was the least performed of all his oratorios, being revived only once in 1755.

Some of Handel's patrons appreciated the work, however. Lord Shaftesbury wrote in a letter to a friend
I can't conclude a letter and forget Theodora. I have heard the work three times and will venture to pronounce it as finished, beautiful and labour'd [well worked-out] a composition as ever Handel made. To my knowledge, this took him up a great while in composing. The Town don't like it at all, but ... several excellent musicians think as I do.
One of Handel's most loyal and enthusiastic supporters, Mary Delany, wrote to her sister Ann saying "Don't you remember our snug enjoyment of "Theodora?" Her sister replied "Surely "Theodora" will have justice at last, if it was to be again performed, but the generality of the world have ears and hear not".

There are two surviving quotes of Handel about Theodora. Morell quotes Handel as saying "The Jews will not come to it because it is a Christian story; and the ladies will not come because it is a virtuous one." Handel's colleague Charles Burney took note when two musicians asked for free tickets for Messiah and Handel responded "Oh your servant, meine Herren! you are damnable dainty! you would not go to Theodora – there was room enough to dance there, when that was perform!"

Theodora was actually Handel's favorite of his oratorios. The composer himself ranked the final chorus of act 2, "He saw the lovely youth", far beyond" "Hallelujah" in Messiah.

It has sometimes been staged as an opera, as in 1996 Glyndebourne and 2009 Salzburg Festival productions. Both of them were recorded and released as DVDs.

The original libretto included an extra scene in which Septimius converted to Christianity himself, but it was never set by Handel, though it was printed. The second scene in act 2 was also subject to several revisions by Handel.

Dramatis personae

Synopsis

Act 1

The 4th century AD. Valens, the Roman governor of Antioch, issues a decree that in honour of Diocletian's birthday all citizens will offer sacrifice to Venus, the Roman goddess of love, and Flora, a fertility goddess of the spring, on pain of death, and puts Septimius in charge of enforcing this.

Didymus, a soldier secretly converted to Christianity, asks that citizens whose consciences prevent them making sacrifices to idols be spared punishment, which Valens dismisses. Septimius suspects Didymus is a Christian and affirms his own loyalty to the law although he pities those who will be condemned to die by the decree and wishes he could be allowed to extend mercy to them.

Theodora, a nobly born Christian and her friend Irene are worshipping with their fellow believers in private rather than joining in the festival for the emperor's birthday when a messenger brings news of Valens' decree. Septimius comes to arrest them – Theodora expects to be put to death but is informed that instead she has been sentenced to serve as a prostitute in the temple of Venus. Theodora would much have preferred to die, but is led away to the temple. Irene informs Didymus who goes in the hope of either rescuing her or dying with her. The first act closes with a chorus of Christians praying for the mission's success.

Act 2

At the start of the second act the festival in honour of the emperor and the goddesses is being enjoyed by the pagans. Valens sends Septimius to tell Theodora that if she doesn't join in with the festival by the end of the day, he will send his guards to rape her. The crowd expresses their satisfaction at this sentence. In the temple of Venus which serves as a brothel, Theodora is frightened, but her mood changes as she contemplates the afterlife. Didymus confesses to his friend and superior officer Septimius that he is a Christian and appeals to the other man's sense of decency. Septimius allows Didymus to visit Theodora. At first Theodora appeals to Didymus to kill her and put an end to her suffering, but instead Didymus persuades her to conceal her identity by putting on his helmet and his uniform and escaping, leaving Didymus in her place. Back at their hideout, Irene and the Christians recall the miracle of The Widow of Nain and hope that, should the lovers die, they will find a new life in heaven.

Act 3

As the third part opens the Christians celebrate Theodora's safe return. However she feels guilty that she endangered Didymus's life in order to save her own. A messenger informs them Didymus has been captured and that Valens has changed Theodora's punishment to death. Theodora goes to offer herself in Didymus' place, despite the protests of her faithful friend Irene. As Valens sentences Didymus to be executed, Theodora enters demanding that she die and Didymus be saved. Both Didymus and Theodora argue that they should die in place of the other. Septimius is moved by this, and pleads for clemency. Valens, however, condemns both Didymus and Theodora to death and they sing a duet to their immortality.

Music and musical characterisation

The oratorio is scored for 2 sections of violins, violas, cellos, double basses, 2 flutes, 2 oboes, 2 bassoons, 1 contrabassoon, 2 horns, 2 trumpets, timpani, harpsichord, and organ. A harpsichord and violoncello play the continuo.

Handel's music gives the choruses of Roman pagans, presented in the libretto as evil people gloating over the torture of Christians, "immense verve and charm". This is contrasted with the quiet, deep conviction of the music for the choruses of Christians. The chorus "He saw the lovely youth", Handel's favorite of all the choruses he wrote, depicts Jesus' raising from the dead of the widow's son in Luke, chapter 7. Beginning with slow and solemn chromatic figures in a minor key, the music switches to major as the youth returns to life and ends with joy as the boy is restored to his mother.
The work is notable for many passages of exalted and radiant beauty as well as for skilled characterisation through music. There are three duets, the last being a sublime piece in which Theodora and Didymus die.

Handel uses trumpets, horns, and drums in the Roman scenes. Flutes are introduced in the prison scene, but some arias are very lightly accompanied which raises them far above the text.

List of musical numbers
(Note: "Symphony" in this context means a purely instrumental piece, a sinfonia. "Accompagnato" is a recitative accompanied by the orchestra, rather than by continuo instruments only, as in the passages marked "recitative".)

Act 1
Scene 1 Valens, Didymus, Septimius, Chorus of Heathens
1. Overture – Trio – Courante
2. Recitative (Valens) "'Tis Dioclesian's natal day"
3. Air (Valens) "Go,my faithful servant,go"
4. Chorus of Heathens "And draw a blessing down"
5. Recitative (Didymus, Valens) "Vouchsafe, dread sir"
6. Air (Valens) "Racks, gibbets, sword and fire"
7. Chorus of Heathens "For ever thus stands fix'd the doom"
Scene 2
8. Recitative (Didymus) "Most cruel edict"
9. Air (Didymus) "The raptur'd soul"
10.Recitative (Septimius) "I know thy virtues"
11. Air (Septimius) "Descend, kind pity"
Scene 3 Theodora, with the Christians
12. Recitative (Theodora) "Though hard, my friends"
13. Air (Theodora) "Fond, flatt'ring world, adieu!"
14. Recitative (Irene) "O bright example of all goodness!"
15. Air (Irene) "Bane of virtue"
16. Chorus of Christians "Come, mighty Father"
Scene 4 Enter Messenger
17. Recitative (Messenger,Irene) "Fly, fly, my brethren"
18. Air (Irene) "As with rosy steps the morn"
19. Chorus of Christians "All pow'r in Heav'n above"
Scene 5 Enter Septimius
20. Recitative (Septimius) "Mistaken wretches!"
21. Air (Septimius) "Dread the fruits of Christian folly"
22. Recitative (Theodora, Septimius) "Deluded mortal!"
23. Accompagnato (Theodora)"Oh, worse than death indeed!"
24. Air (Theodora)"Angels, ever bright and fair"
Scene 6 Enter Didymus
25. Recitative (Didymus,Irene) "Unhappy, happy crew!"
26. Air (Didymus) "Kind Heav'n"
Scene 7
27. Recitative (Irene) "O love, how great thy pow'r!"
28. Chorus of Christians "Go, gen'rous, pious youth"

Act 2
Scene 1 Valens, and Chorus of Heathens
29. Recitative (Valens) "Ye men of Antioch"
30. Chorus of Heathens "Queen of summer, queen of love"
31. Air (Valens) "Wide spread his name"
32. Recitative (Valens) "Return, Septimius, to the stubborn maid"
33. Chorus of Heathens "Venus laughing from the skies"
Scene 2 Theodora, in her Place of Confinement
34. Symphony
35. Recitative (Theodora) "O thou bright sun!"
36. Air (Theodora) "With darkness deep"
37. Symphony
38. Recitative (Theodora) "But why art thou disquieted, my soul?"
39. Air (Theodora) "Oh, that I on wings could rise"
Scene 3 Didymus and Septimius
40. Recitative (Didymus,Septimius) "Long have I known thy friendly social soul"
41. Air (Septimius) "Though the honours"
42. Recitative (Didymus, Septimius) "Oh, save her then"
43. Air (Didymus) "Deeds of kindness to display"
Scene 4 Irene, with the Christians
44. Recitative (Irene) "The clouds begin to veil"
45. Air (Irene) "Defend her, Heav'n!"
Scene 5 Theodora's Place of Confinement.
Didymus at a distance, the vizor of his helmet clos'd
46. Recitative (Didymus) "Or lull'd with grief"
47. Air (Didymus approaching her) "Sweet rose and lily"
48. Recitative (Theodora starting, Didymus) "Oh, save me, Heav'n!"
49. Air (Theodora) "The pilgrim's home"
50. Accompagnato (Didymus,Theodora) "Forbid it, Heav'n!"
51. Duet (Theodora,Didymus) "To thee, thou glorious son of worth"
Scene 6 Irene, with the Christians
52. Recitative (Irene) "Tis night, but night's sweet blessing is denied"
53. Chorus of Christians "He saw the lovely youth"

Act 3
Scene 1 Irene, with the Christians
54. Air (Irene) "Lord, to Thee each night and day"
Scene 2 Enter Theodora, in the habit of Didymus
55. Recitative (Irene, Theodora discovering herself)"But see, the good, the virtuous Didymus!"
56. Air (Theodora) "When sunk in anguish and despair"
57. Solo and Chorus (Christians, Theodora) "Blest be the hand"
Scene 3 Enter Messenger
58. Recitative (Messenger,Irene,Theodora) "Undaunted in the court stands Didymus"
59. Duet (Irene,Theodora) "Whither, Princess, do you fly?"
60. Recitative (Irene) "She's gone"
61. Air (Irene) "New scenes of joy"
Scene 4 Valens, Didymus, Septimius, and Chorus of Heathens
62. Recitative (Valens,Didymus,Theodora,Septimius) "Is it a Christian virtue then?"
Scene 5
63. Air (Septimius) "From virtue springs each gen'rous deed"
64. Air (Valens) "Cease, ye slaves, your fruitless pray'r!"
65. Recitative (Didymus, Theodora) "'Tis kind, my friends"
66. Chorus of Heathens "How strange their ends"
67. Recitative (Didymus,Theodora, Valens) "On me your frowns"
68. Air (Valens) "Ye ministers of justice"
Scene 6
69. Recitative (Didymus,Theodora, Septimius) "And must such beauty suffer?"
70. Air and Duet (Didymus, Theodora) "Streams of pleasure ever flowing"
Scene 7 Irene, with the Christians
71. Recitative (Irene) "Ere this, their doom is past"
72. Chorus of Christians "O love divine"

Productions 
The 1996 production by William Christie with the Orchestra of the Age of Enlightenment and the Glyndebourne Festival Chorus, produced by Peter Sellars, was described as a "landmark". Dawn Upshaw sang Theodora, David Daniels sang Didymus, and the execution of each lead character was set "on a gurney in a Texas military hospital awaiting execution" by lethal injection. A DVD of the production was available from the Glyndebourne online shop.

In 2022, the Royal Opera House in London staged its first production since the 1750 premiere. Directed by Katie Mitchell, the production was set in "an alternative modern-day reality".

Recordings

Audio recordings

Video recordings

Notes

External links
 Complete libretto of Theodora (hosted by Stanford University)
Score of Theodora (ed. Friedrich Chrysander, Leipzig 1860)

Oratorios by George Frideric Handel
Operas by George Frideric Handel
1749 compositions
Operas
1750 operas